Charné Lynn Maddocks (born 10 June 1998) is a field hockey player from South African. In 2020, she was an athlete at the Summer Olympics.

Personal life
Charné Maddocks was born and raised in Kimberley, South Africa. Her brother, Melrick, also represents South Africa in field hockey.

Maddocks is a student at North-West University in Potchefstroom.

Career

National team
Despite never having made an international appearance, Maddocks was named to the South Africa squad for the 2020 Summer Olympics in Tokyo.

She will make her international and Olympic debut on 24 July 2021, in the Pool A match against Ireland.

References

External links

1998 births
Living people
Female field hockey forwards
South African female field hockey players
Field hockey players at the 2020 Summer Olympics
Olympic field hockey players of South Africa
North-West University Hockey Club players
21st-century South African women